D×D×D (pronounced "D D D") is the fourth Japanese studio album by South Korean boy band Shinee. It was released on January 1, 2016, by Universal Music Japan sub label EMI Records. The album features three previously released singles, "Your Number", "Sing Your Song" and the Japanese version of previous Korean single "View", and one new single, "DxDxD". The album reached number one on the Oricon weekly chart, becoming the first album to do so in 2016. It was Shinee's second number one album in Japan following their 2014 release I'm Your Boy.

Background and release
D×D×D is the fourth Japanese album released by Shinee. It was released in three versions: a limited CD+Blu-ray edition "A", a limited CD+DVD edition "B" and a regular edition. Both limited editions were housed in a digipack and a slipcase and came with 48-page photobooklet (type A), a trading card (one of five) and a special event application sheet. The Blu-ray of limited edition A, in addition to the music videos and making-ofs, also included a high-resolution (48 kHz / 24bit) recording of the album. The regular edition came with a 28-page photobooklet (type B) and a special event application sheet. The album includes all tracks from the group's last two Japanese singles "Sing Your Song" and "Your Number", a Japanese version of their Korean track "View", and seven new songs.

The Fourth Japan Tour
Shinee World 2016 is the fourth Japan nationwide concert tour by Shinee to promote their fourth Japanese studio album. The tour kicked off in Fukuoka on January 30, 2016, and ended in Hokkaido on April 24, 2016, with a total of 16 concerts in eight cities.

After the success of their first two-day Tokyo Dome stage in March 2015, Shinee returned with a more formal dome tour as part of their Japan Arena Tour. They performed at Kyocera Dome on May 14 and 15, 2016, and were back to Tokyo Dome on the 18th and 19th of the same month.

Commercial performance
The album sold 44,921 copies in its first week.

Track listing

Charts

Weekly charts

Monthly charts

Year-end charts

References

Shinee albums
SM Entertainment albums
EMI Records albums
Universal Music Japan albums
2016 albums
Japanese-language albums